Edobacomab, codenamed E5, is a mouse monoclonal antibody that was investigated as a possible treatment for sepsis caused by Gram-negative bacterial infections.

Further reading 

 
 
 

Monoclonal antibodies
Abandoned drugs